Since its inception in 1898, the Yale Bulldogs swimming and diving program has produced numerous champion athletes. Many Yale swimmers have gone on to earn All-American honors and even break world records. The team has won 4 NCAA championships, 30 EISL championships, and several AAU championships. Under legendary coach Robert J. H. Kiphuth, the Yale men swam to a record of 528 wins and 12 losses. As of February 2009, the men's program has a record of 1063 wins and 210 losses over 112 years. The first varsity women's team competed in 1975.

History

Coaches
Thomas O'Callahan (1906–1915) 47-14
Matthew Mann (1915–1917) 17-3
Robert J. H. Kiphuth (1917–1959) 528-12
Phil Moriarty (1959–1976) 195-25
Edward L. Bettendorf (1976–1977) 8-3
Paul Katz (1977–1978) 3-7
Frank P. Keefe (1978–2010) 241-127 (men)
Timothy Wise (2010–2017) (men)
Jim Henry (2013-present) 28 - 7 (women, combined 2017-present)

Captains and season records

Men
 1898-1899 ? 1-2
 1899-1900 ? 1-1
 1900-1901 ? 1-0
 1901-1902 ? 5-3
 1902-1903 ? 2-3
 1903-1904 ? 2-1
 1904-1905 ? 4-1
 1905-1906 ? 3-2
 1906-1907 ? 2-3
 1907-1908 ? 3-2
 1908-1909 Edward C. M. Richards 4-2
 1909-1910 Edward C. M. Richards 7-0
 1910-1911 William Howe 5-0
 1911-1912 John Cameron Stoddart 3-2
 1912-1913 Andrew Wilson 8-2
 1913-1914 Paul Roberts 7-1
 1914-1915 Daniel Summers 8-2
 1915-1916 Carl V. Schlaet 7-2
 1916-1917 Louis A. Ferguson 10-1
 1917-1918 Richard Mayer 8-1
 1918-1919 John M. Hincks 7-0
 1919-1920 John M. Hincks 10-0
 1920-1921 Lorrin P. Thurston 14-0
 1921-1922 C. Dudley Pratt 14-0
 1922-1923 William L. Jelliffe 15-0
 1923-1924 Robert B. Colgate 10-4
 1924-1925 Robert J. Sullivan 14-0
 1925-1926 James D. Bronson 14-0
 1926-1927 Phil W. Bunnell 14-0
 1927-1928 James A. House, Jr. 14-0
 1928-1929 John A. Pope 12-0
 1929-1930 John V. Howland 14-0
 1930-1931 Robert L. Messimer 14-0
 1931-1932 Lloyd B. Osborne 11-0
 1932-1933 Albert T. Hapke 14-0
 1933-1934 Joseph Barker 14-0
 1934-1935 David Livingston 12-0
 1935-1936 Norris D. Hoyt 14-0
 1936-1937 Richard A. Cooke 14-1
 1937-1938 John Macionis 10-3
 1938-1939 John W. Good 15-1
 1939-1940 Russ P. Duncan 15-1
 1940-1941 Willis H. Sanburn III 13-0
 1941-1942 Howard R. Johnson 12-0
 1942-1943 L.D. Dannenbaum 13-0
 1943-1944 Richard Lyon 10-0
 1944-1945 Alan R. Ford 8-1
 1945-1946 Philetus Stetler 8-0
 1946-1947 Edward K. Heuber 13-0
 1947-1948 Allan M. Stack 12-0
 1948-1949 Richard B. Baribault 13-0
 1949-1950 Albert J. Ratkiewicz 13-0
 1950-1951 Raymond M. Reid 13-0
 1951-1952 James J. Carroll 13-0
 1952-1953 Wayne R. Moor 14-0
 1953-1954 Kenneth S. Welch 13-0
 1954-1955 Malcolm P. Aldrich, Jr. 14-0
 1955-1956 John P. Phair 15-0
 1956-1957 William T. Clinton 14-0
 1957-1958 Peter R. Taft 13-0
 1958-1959 P. Timothy Jecko 13-0
 1959-1960 Peter Lusk 14-0
 1960-1961 Thomas Bissell 12-1
 1961-1962 William McMaster 12-1
 1962-1963 John Finch 13-0
 1963-1964 Michael M. Austin 13-0
 1964-1965 Stephen E. Clark 13-0
 1965-1966 George S. Hill 12-1
 1966-1967 Douglas Kennedy 14-0
 1967-1968 Donald A. Schollander 14-0
 1968-1969 Robert S. Waples, Jr. 15-0
 1969-1970 Edward L. Bettendorf 14-0
 1970-1971 Michael W. Cadden 12-1
 1971-1972 Robert Kasting 10-3
 1972-1973 Nate Cartmell 10-1
 1973-1974 Chuck Holum 6-5
 1974-1975 Bryan Smith 4-6
 1975-1976 Bob Blattner 7-6
 1976-1977 Quentin Lawler 8-3
 1977-1978 Bill Lindsay 3-7
 1978-1979 Jim Healy 5-6
 1979-1980 Mark DeVore 5-6
 1980-1981 Kurt Langborg 5-6
 1981-1982 Bob Murchison 7-5
 1982-1983 Jon Sharp 6-6
 1983-1984 Geoff Pitt 3-8
 1984-1985 Jason Green 7-5
 1985-1986 Todd Kaplan 3-7
 1986-1987 Bert Hazlett 7-4
 1987-1988 Jeff Kaplan 3-7
 1988-1989 Eric Breissinger 5-7
 1989-1990 Dave Jacobs 7-4
 1990-1991 Greg Reihman 10-3
 1991-1992 Greg Reihman 9-1
 1992-1993 Mike Englesbe 13-1
 1993-1994 Sean Tesoro 10-2
 1994-1995 Mike Kostal 11-5
 1995-1996 John Mendell 7-7
 1996-1997 Brian Hall 9-3
 1997-1998 David Antonelli 7-4
 1998-1999 Steve Gold 10-1
 1999-2000 Mike Caperonis 10-2
 2000-2001 George Gleason 10-3
 2001-2002 Pat Dennis 14-1
 2002-2003 Greg Palumbo 11-2
 2003-2004 Alex Nash 10-2
 2004-2005 Dave Lange 7-5
 2005-2006 Brendan Everman 8-4
 2006-2007 Geof Zann 7-3
 2007-2008 Colin Stalnecker 8-3
 2008-2009 Alex Righi 7-4
 2009-2010 Thomas Robinson 5-6
 2010-2011 Kyle Veatch 2-8
 2011-2012 Christopher Luu 6-2
 2012-2013 Jared Lovett 8-2
 2013-2014 Ed Becker 7-3
 2014-2015 Andrew Heymann 8-2
 2015-2016 Brian Hogan 
 2016-2017 Alex Goss
 2017-2018 James Bell
 2018-2019 Adrian Lin
 2019-2020 Matthew Slabe
 2020-2021 Patrick Frith

NCAA Championships
1942
1944
1951
1953

Men's EISL Championships
Yale is in the Ivy League, but men's swimming traditionally competes in the Eastern Intercollegiate Swim League (EISL), which pre-dates the Ivy League by 18 years. The EISL currently includes all the Ivy League schools.

1936
1939
1940
1941
1942

1943
1946
1947
1948
1949

1950
1951
1952
1953
1954

1955
1956
1957
1958
1959

1960
1961
1963
1964
1965

1967
1968
1969
1970
1973

Women's Ivy Championships
1978
1992
1993
1996
1997
2017

Olympians

Athletes
1912, Stockholm
Arthur McAleenan, diving
1936, Berlin
John Macionis, 400 Free, 800 Free Relay silver
1948, London
Alan Ford, 100 Free silver
James McLane, 400 Free silver, 1500 Free gold, 800 Free Relay Gold
John Marshall (Australia), 400 Free bronze, 1500 Free silver
Allen Stack, 100 Back gold
1952, Helsinki
Rex Aubrey (Australia), 100 Free, 1500 Free, 800 Free Relay
James McLane, 800 Free Relay gold, 400 Free, 1500 Free
John Marshall (Australia), 400 Free, 800 Free Relay
Wayne Moore, 800 Free Relay gold, 400 Free
Donald Sheff, alternate 800 Free Relay
Allen Stack, 100 Back
1956, Melbourne
Timothy Jecko, alternate 800 Free Relay
John Marshall (Australia), 200 Fly
1960, Rome
Stephen Clark, alternate 400 Medley Relay, 800 Free Relay
Jeffrey Farrell, 400 Medley Relay gold, 800 Free Relay gold
1964, Tokyo
Michael Austin, 400 Free Relay gold, 100 Free
Stephen Clark, 400 Medley Relay gold, 400 Free Relay gold, 800 Free Relay gold
David Lyons, alternate 400 Free Relay, 800 Free Relay
William Mettler, alternate 800 Free Relay
John Nelson, 1500 Free silver, 400 Free
Donald Schollander, 100 Free gold, 400 Free gold, 400 Free Relay gold, 800 Free Relay gold
Edward Townsend, alternate 400 Free Relay, 800 Free Relay
1968, Mexico City
David Johnson, alternate 400 Free Relay, alternate 800 Free Relay
Philip Long, 200 Breast
John Nelson, 800 Free Relay gold, 200 Free bronze, 400 Free, 1500 Free
Donald Schollander, 800 Free Relay gold, 200 Free silver, alternate 400 Medley Relay, 400 Free Relay
1972, Munich
Erik Fish (Canada), 400 Medley Relay bronze
Robert Kasting (Canada), 400 Medley Relay bronze
1976, Montreal
Lionel Bourcelot (France), 100 Back
1984, Los Angeles
George Gross (Canada), Water Polo
2000, Sydney
Stephen Fahy (Bermuda), 100 Fly, 200 IM
George Gleason (U.S. Virgin Islands), 100 Free, 200 Free, 200 IM
Emily de Riel, Modern Pentathlon silver
2004, Athens
George Gleason (U.S. Virgin Islands), 100 Free
2004, Athens (Paralympics)
Deb Gruen, 100m Breaststroke ("bronze"), 100m Freestyle, 200m Individual Medley, 400m Freestyle, 50m Butterfly
2008, Beijing (Paralympics)
 Deb Gruen, 400 Freestyle, 50 Fly, 100 Breast (American Record) bronze, 200 IM

Coaches
Robert J. H. Kiphuth: 1928, 1932, 1936, 1940, 1948
Philip Moriarty: 1960
Frank Keefe: 1984, 1988, 2000

Pan American Games Champions
Eva Fabian
Jim McLane

Facilities

The Yale Swimming & Diving teams train and compete in the Payne Whitney Gymnasium on Yale's campus.  The third-floor practice pool is a 5-lane, 50-meter course with two moveable bulkheads that allow the pool to be divided into two 25-yard courses.  The Robert J. H. Kiphuth Exhibition Pool is the competition venue, and is a 6-lane 25-yard course with seating for 2,178.

References

External links
Men's website
Women's website